Heteroconger balteatus is an eel in the family Congridae (conger/garden eels). It was described by Peter Henry John Castle and John Ernest Randall in 1999. It is a marine, tropical eel which is known from Saudi Arabia and the Red Sea, in the western Indian Ocean. It enters its burrows tail-first.

The species epithet balteatus refers to the white "belt" on the trunk of the eel. Its diet consists of zooplankton.

References

balteatus
Taxa named by Peter Henry John Castle
Taxa named by John Ernest Randall
Fish described in 1999